Sonapur is an urban area in Bhandup, Mumbai, Maharashtra state of India.

References 

Suburbs of Mumbai